Acutichiton is among the most primitive genera of Neoloricate chitons.  Acutichiton became extinct during the Carboniferous period.  Articulated specimens are known.

References 

Prehistoric chiton genera
Early Devonian first appearances
Carboniferous extinctions